Anton Jánoš (born 28 February 1958) is a former football goalkeeper from Slovakia and former manager of ŠK SFM Senec.

Honours

Manager
Tatran Prešov
Slovak Cup: Runners-up: 1996-97

Dukla Banská Bystrica
DOXXbet liga: Winners: 2002–03 (Promoted)

References

External links
 

1958 births
Living people
Slovak footballers
Slovak football managers
MŠK Žilina managers
FC Spartak Trnava managers
AS Trenčín managers
FK Dukla Banská Bystrica managers
Association football goalkeepers
FK Inter Bratislava players
FK Dukla Banská Bystrica players
People from Malacky District
Sportspeople from the Bratislava Region
1. FC Tatran Prešov managers